The 1991 Tour de Romandie was the 45th edition of the Tour de Romandie cycle race and was held from 7 May to 12 May 1991. The race started in Chiasso and finished in Geneva. The race was won by Tony Rominger of the Toshiba team.

General classification

References

1991
Tour de Romandie